Noda Station may refer to either of two railway stations in Osaka, Japan. These are:
Noda Station (JR West), on the Osaka Loop Line of the West Japan Railway Company 
Noda Station (Hanshin), on the Main Line of the Hanshin Electric Railway